Brand New is the debut solo album released by former Liberty X band member Kevin Simm. The album was officially released on 3 October 2008 in Japan.

Singles
"Brand New" was released as the lead single from the album 9 August 2008. "It's About Us" was released as the second single from the album 29 October 2008. "Hot Summer's Day" was released as the third single from the album 17 December 2008.

Track listing

Chart performance

Weekly charts

Release history

References

2008 debut albums
Kevin Simm albums